Li Ting (born 5 January 1980) is a Chinese former professional tennis player. She won the gold medal at the 2004 Summer Olympics in women's doubles alongside Sun Tiantian.

Education
She graduated from the Huazhong University of Science and Technology in 2002.

Career
As a doubles player, Li has enjoyed great success, winning 26 ITF titles and a further seven WTA titles by March 2006.

She competed at the 2004 Summer Olympics, defeating Spain to win a gold medal in the women's tennis doubles along with her partner Sun Tiantian.

As a singles player, Li enjoyed limited success in ITF events until June 2000, when she qualified for a WTA tournament at Tashkent, then defeated Alina Jidkova of Russia in the first round of the main draw, before bowing out in Round Two. As a wildcard entrant to the WTA event at Shanghai that September, she lost in three sets to Tara Snyder in the first round. Without further success for the rest of the year, she ended world-ranked 325, beating her previous personal best of 347 at the end of 1998.

A year of indifferent results at lowly ITF level followed in 2001, but in September she came through qualifying with three straight wins to reach Shanghai again, beating countrywoman Liu Nannan in the final round, only to lose to Frenchwoman Nathalie Dechy in the main draw. But this achievement was not enough to prevent her world ranking from dropping to 536 by the year's end.

2002 was a poorer year still for Li Ting in singles, as she failed to qualify for Shanghai and won only one match in just four ITF tournaments entered, leading her year-end ranking to slump to 837.

In 2003, she audaciously attempted to buck this trend by boldly entering qualifying for several WTA Tour events while shunning the ITF circuit altogether, and managed to win her first round qualifying ties at Hyderabad, Bali and Shanghai, but failed to progress further until the Japan Open in late September, for which she qualified with wins over Ivana Abramović and Yan Zi, before being easily beaten by Shinobu Asagoe of Japan in the main draw first round. Frustrated with her lack of progress at WTA level, she retreated into ITF territory, and met with some success at the $50,000 Paducah tournament in October, where she gained main draw entry as a lucky loser in qualifying, then reached the quarter-final before losing to Zheng Jie in three sets. Following this result, she was awarded wild-cards into two further $50,000 tournaments, but won just one match at the second. Still, she had pulled her world ranking back up inside the top 500, to No. 436.

In 2004, as if from nowhere, Li Ting's WTA career took off. She qualified for Doha with wins over Shikha Uberoi and future stars Mara Santangelo and Maret Ani, then defeated Els Callens in the main draw first round before losing in straight sets to Jennifer Capriati despite forcing a tie-break in the first set. In May, she proved this superb performance was no accident by qualifying for her second successive WTA tournament, this time defeating Martina Müller, Mervana Jugić-Salkić and Michaela Paštiková, all very capable top-150 players, in straight sets, then stunned Iveta Benešová 6–4, 6–1 in the main draw first round before being downed in three sets by Jelena Kostanić in Round 2. She competed little over the summer, but entered qualifying for Beijing in September, beating Martina Suchá in the first round before losing to her on-form countrywoman Li Na. At Guangzhou, she was awarded a wildcard to the main draw, and proved she deserved it by advancing to the semi-final with easy straight-sets victories over Anikó Kapros, Nicole Pratt and (most impressively of all) Peng Shuai, only to lose again to her former long-time doubles partner (and the eventual tournament champion) Li Na. In October, she entered the first $50k Shenzhen tournament, and again impressed in reaching the quarter-finals after a first-round win over Yan Zi, before losing two matches later to Sun Tiantian. Li Ting ended the year in the top 400 for the first time since 2000, and in the top 300 for the first time in her career, world-ranked 168, after a vastly improved season.

January 2005 saw Li Ting qualify for her first Grand Slam tournament at the Australian Open, with notable wins over Laura Pous Tió and Sandra Kloesel; and she took a set from Marta Domachowska of Poland in the main draw first round but lost the match. In February, she won another three back-to-back matches to qualify for Hyderabad, but then lost to upcoming starlet Jarmila Gajdošová in the first round of the tournament proper. At Doha, she reached the final round of qualifying with wins over Zheng Jie and Anca Barna, then lost to Roberta Vinci. At Dubai, she took Maria Kirilenko to three sets, two of them tie-breaks, in an unfortunate first-round qualifying draw which she ultimately lost. But by the end of February she had improved her world-ranking to a career-best 136.

Unfortunately for Li Ting, her results at WTA events then took a downward turn for the next six months. Although she battled through to win a $50k event at Beijing in June, defeating Yan Zi surprisingly comfortably in the final, this career-best tournament victory was a blip on the radar of her disappointing summer results at WTA tournaments. In September, however, she came close to qualifying for Beijing, beating Martina Müller before losing to Emma Laine in three sets. Then at Guangzhou, she reached the quarterfinal with excellent wins over Vera Zvonareva and Alina Jidkova, then very nearly reached the semifinal for the second successive year, as she pushed eventual finalist Nuria Llagostera Vives all the way before finally losing their joust 6–3, 4–6, 6–7. But after this, she did not play again for the rest of the year, and ended it ranked 177th, down almost forty places on her peak.

2006 began promisingly enough for Li Ting, as she qualified for January's Australian Open for the second successive year, only to lose this time to the inspired young Russian star Elena Vesnina. She also impressed in qualifying for Doha, Qatar in February, with wins over Yan Zi and Tatiana Poutchek; but Maria Kirilenko, now ranked in the world top 30, once again proved the more capable player as they met in the first round of the main draw, defeating Li Ting in straight sets. Her ranking had slipped to 209 by the end of the month; but she has proven that she is capable of competing with players of top 100 calibre, and provided that she herself has the will to persist, tennis supporters can confidently expect to see plenty more fireworks from this talented 26-year-old doubles specialist in singles events before she calls time on her career.

In 2007, Li stopped partnering with fellow countrywomen Sun Tiantian, to make room for a new Chinese doubles player, Sun Shengnan was paired with Sun Tiantian, according to the 2007 Australian Open website.

Olympic finals

Doubles: 1 (gold medal)

WTA career finals

Doubles: 14 (10 titles, 4 runner-ups)

ITF Circuit finals

Singles: 3 (3–0)

Doubles: 37 (26–11)

See also
 Tennis in China

References

External links
 
 
 

1980 births
Living people
Chinese female tennis players
Olympic gold medalists for China
Olympic tennis players of China
Tennis players from Wuhan
Tennis players at the 2000 Summer Olympics
Tennis players at the 2004 Summer Olympics
Olympic medalists in tennis
Asian Games medalists in tennis
Tennis players at the 2002 Asian Games
Tennis players at the 2006 Asian Games
Medalists at the 2004 Summer Olympics
Universiade medalists in tennis
Medalists at the 2006 Asian Games
Asian Games bronze medalists for China
Universiade gold medalists for China
Medalists at the 2001 Summer Universiade
21st-century Chinese women
20th-century Chinese women